The Liuzzi class was a class of four submarines built by Tosi in Taranto for the Royal Italian Navy.  The submarines were built in 1939 and began their Second World War service in the Mediterranean Sea, where Liuzzi was sunk.  The three surviving boats were transferred to the BETASOM Atlantic submarine base at Bordeaux in 1940.  After Tarantini was sunk, Bagnolini and Giuliani were selected for conversion to "transport submarines" in order to exchange rare or irreplaceable trade goods with Japan.  Cargo capacity of 160 tons reduced reserve buoyancy from between 20 and 25% to between 3.5 and 6%; and armament was reduced to defensive machine guns. They submarines saw action in the Second World War during which they collectively sunk 5 freighters and 1 light cruiser and were eventually either sunk or captured.

Ships

Console Generale Liuzzi
 was launched 17 September 1939.  Two weeks after the Italian declaration of war, Liuzzi was sunk by Royal Navy destroyers south of Crete on 27 June 1940.

Alpino Bagnolini
Bagnolini (pennant number BI) was launched 28 October 1939 and completed on 22 December 1939. A second Mediterranean war patrol was unsuccessful. Bagnolini sailed on 9 September 1940 and passed the Strait of Gibraltar on 13 September for an Atlantic patrol to Bordeaux on 30 September. En route Bagnolini torpedoed the neutral Spanish freighter Gabo Tortosa. Bagnolini sank a single ship on its first BETASOM patrol before being damaged by anti-submarine patrols. A July 1941 patrol off Gibraltar and a patrol off the Azores from 18 January to 22 February 1942 were unsuccessful; and three patrols to the South Atlantic from 24 April to 28 June, from 15 September to 7 November 1942, and from 14 February to 13 April 1943 were similarly unproductive. After conversion to a German transport submarine, Bagnolini sailed as UIT-22 on 26 January 1944 and was sunk off the Cape of Good Hope by No. 262 Squadron RAF Consolidated PBY Catalinas on 11 March.

Reginaldo Giuliani
Giuliani (pennant number GN) was launched 3 December 1939. After two unsuccessful Mediterranean war patrols, Giuliani sailed on 29 August 1940 and passed the Strait of Gibraltar on 10 September for an Atlantic patrol to Bordeaux on 30 September. After an unsuccessful BETASOM patrol in November, Giuliani sailed on 16 March 1941 to serve as a training submarine at Gdynia to instruct Italian officers in attack techniques and methodologies employed by the Germans. From April 1941 to April 1942 training courses of two to five weeks including Baltic Sea cruises of ten to twenty days were completed by seven Italian crews. Giuliani returned to Bordeaux on 23 May 1942. Giuliani sank three ships during a patrol off the Cape Verde Islands from 24 June to 3 September 1942. Giuliani remained in the Spanish port of Santander, Cantabria until 8 November 1942 repairing damage inflicted by Short Sunderlands on 1 September and No. 304 Squadron's Wellington on 2 September. After return to France and conversion to a transport submarine, Giuliani sailed on 16 May 1943 with 130 tonnes of mercury and reached Singapore on 1 August 1943. When Italy surrendered on 8 September 1943 Giuliani was seized by Germany in Singapore and renamed UIT-23. There were 14 survivors from the crew of forty.

Capitano Tarantini
Tarantini (pennant number TT) was launched 7 January 1940 and was on patrol in the Mediterranean when Italy declared war. Tarantini sank one ship on its second Mediterranean war patrol, but then had two unsuccessful patrols. Tarantini sailed on 31 August 1940 and passed the Strait of Gibraltar on 10 September for an Atlantic patrol to Bordeaux on 5 October. Five of the crew were rescued.

See also
 Italian submarines of World War II

References

Notes

Bibliography
 Brice, Martin Axis Blockade Runners of World War II (1981) Naval Institute Press 
 Erminio Bagnasco, Submarines of World War Two, Cassell & Co, London. 1977 
 Kafka, Roger & Pepperburg, Roy L. Warships of the World Cornell Maritime Press (1946)

External links
 Alpino Bagnolini Marina Militare website
 Console Generale Liuzzi Marina Militare website
 Reginaldo Giuliani Marina Militare website
 Capitano Tarantini Marina Militare website

Submarine classes
 
World War II submarines of Italy
Ships built by Cantieri navali Tosi di Taranto